Hopelessly Devoted: The Hits is an Australian-only greatest hits album by English-Australian singer Olivia Newton-John, released on 8 June 2018 by Sony Music Australia, following the premiere of the Australian miniseries based on her life, Olivia Newton-John: Hopelessly Devoted to You, starring Delta Goodrem. The album debuted at number 14 on the ARIA Charts.

The album re-entered the charts and peaked at number 5 in August 2023, following Newton-John’s death.

Track listing

Charts

References

2018 greatest hits albums
Sony Music Australia compilation albums
Olivia Newton-John compilation albums